Pityusa Patera is a feature in the Mare Australe quadrangle of Mars, located at 67.0° S and 323.1° W.  It is 230.0 km across and was named after a classical albedo feature name.

References

Mare Australe quadrangle
Volcanoes of Mars